Paola Voci is an Italian-born academic specialising in Chinese language and culture, film and media studies, visual culture, and digital culture. She is a professor at the University of Otago in Dunedin, New Zealand.

Biography 
Voci was born in Italy. She holds a B.A. with honours in Chinese language and literature from the University of Venice, a diploma in film theory and practice from the Beijing Film Academy, and an MA in East Asian studies and a PhD in Chinese from Indiana University.

She served as president of NZASIA (The New Zealand Asian Studies Society) from 2015 to 2017.

Publications 

 Voci, P., & Luo, H. (2018). Screening China's soft power. London: Routledge.
Voci, P., & Leckie, J. (2011). Localizing Asia in Aotearoa. Auckland, N.Z: Dunmore Pub.
Voci, P. (2010). China on video: Smaller-screen realities. London: Routledge.

References

Living people
Year of birth missing (living people)
Academic staff of the University of Otago
Italian emigrants to New Zealand
Indiana University alumni
Ca' Foscari University of Venice alumni
New Zealand women academics